Jeff Coetzee and Wesley Moodie were the defending champions, but Coetzee chose not to participate that year. Moodie partnered with Dick Norman, but lost in the semifinals to Martin Damm and Robert Lindstedt.

Seeds

Draw

Draw

External links
Draw

2009 Estoril Open - Men's Doubles
Estoril Open - Mens Doubles, 2009
Estoril Open - Mens Doubles, 2009